The 2019 Austin Bold FC season is the inaugural season for Austin Bold FC in the USL Championship, the second-tier professional soccer league in the United States and Canada.

Club

Competitions

Preseason

USL Championship

Standings

Match results

The 2019 USL Championship season schedule for the club was announced on December 19, 2018.

July 3

Unless otherwise noted, all times in CDT

USL Cup Playoffs

U.S. Open Cup

As a member of the USL Championship, Austin Bold FC will enter the tournament in the Second Round, to be played May 14–15, 2019

References

 
Austin
Austin Bold
Austin